Alfiya Bigbulatova (born 17 January 1989) is an Azerbaijani former footballer who played as a goalkeeper. She has been a member of the Azerbaijan women's national team.

See also
List of Azerbaijan women's international footballers

References

1989 births
Living people
Women's association football goalkeepers
Azerbaijani women's footballers
Azerbaijan women's international footballers